Lubomir Geraskov (born December 27, 1968) is a Bulgarian gymnast and Olympic champion. He competed at the 1988 Summer Olympics in Seoul where he won Olympic gold on pommel horse.

Early life
Lyubomir Geraskov was born on December 27, 1968, in his hometown, slightly on the outskirts of Bulgaria's capital and largest city, Sofia. Under the communist law, Lubomir was forced into strict schooling. This though, was where his gymnastics talent began to become very noticeable to many people.

As a result, he was taken into a Bulgarian Youth Sports School at a very young age. His high talent and great progress was, from then on, revealed to the rest of the nation. He became very well known for being one of the greatest gymnasts of his time. At such a young age, Lyubomir had won numerous regional and national titles to his name. He was mostly dominant on the Pommel Horse, which many would say, he could not be beaten at. During his teenage years, his hometown club, Levski Sofia, recruited him to their squad, helping them win numerous championships along the way. At the same time, Lubomir was taken into the Olympic national team where most of his talent and glory would come to be recognized worldwide.

Career

World Championships and Olympic Success
At only the age of 18, Lyubomir Geraskov would earn the bronze medal on both the pommel horse and floor exercise at the 1987 World Artistic Gymnastics Championships in Rotterdam. His climax of glory came a year later when he won the gold medal at the Olympic Games in Seoul Korea, scoring a perfect 10.00. He became the second man in Bulgarian history to win a gold medal in the sport of gymnastics along with being the youngest, at only age 19. To top off his gymnastic career, Lyubomir was inducted into the Bulgarian Sports Hall of Fame, becoming a very popular men's gymnastics figure in Bulgarian sports history.

 He received two bronze medals at the 1987 World Artistic Gymnastics Championships in Rotterdam.

Honours

 Olympics
 First Place (1) Pommel Horse: 1988
 World Championships
 Third Place (2) Floor, Pommel Horse: 1987
  Balkan Cup
 First Place (1): 1986
  Bulgarian Cup
 First Place (1): 1985

References

External links

1968 births
Living people
Bulgarian male artistic gymnasts
Gymnasts at the 1988 Summer Olympics
Olympic gymnasts of Bulgaria
Olympic gold medalists for Bulgaria
Olympic medalists in gymnastics
Bulgarian emigrants to the United States
Medalists at the 1988 Summer Olympics